Basant is a 1942 pre-partition Indian romantic musical film directed by Amiya Chakrabarty, produced by Bombay Talkies and starring Mumtaz Shanti and Madhubala along with Ulhas. It revolves around Uma (Shanti), who is left to dance on stage for money when her husband (Ulhas) abandons her.

Basant marked the Hindi film debut of Shanti, who was already a celebrated star in Punjabi film industry. However, the film is largely remembered as the first screen appearance of Madhubala, who played an uncredited role of daughter to Shanti and later became a leading star in the 1950s and early 1960s.

The film was theatrically released on 29 July 1942 and was praised by critics for the performances of actors, music and direction. It was major box office success and the highest-grossing film of 1942. The film had a 76-week run in the theatres. As of 2021, Basant remains one of the fifty highest-grossing Indian films in the history (when adjusted for inflation).

Plot 

Uma and her brother Babul are two downtrodden servants who dream of becoming singing-and-dancing stars on the stage. They attract the attention of the impresario Janaki Prasad, which leads to Uma marrying his spoilt and envious younger brother, Nirmal. A self-absorbed Nirmal sets out to make his own fortune and soon after their wedding, abandons Uma and their infant daughter, which is named Manju. When Nirmal returns to find his wife is working on the stage, he abducts Manju and disappears again. After a further 10 years of unhappy stage stardom of Uma, the family is reunited and the happy ending sees her return to being a housewife in accordance with her husband's wishes.

Cast

 Mumtaz Shanti as Uma
 Ulhas as Nirmal
 Mumtaz Ali as Babul, Uma's brother
 P. F. Pithawala as Janaki Prasad, Nirmal's brother
 Suresh as Babul, Uma's brother (child role)
 Jagannath as Meena's Father
 Kamala
 Kanu Roy as House Rent Collector
 
 
 Pramila as Meena
 Baby Mumtaz as Manju (uncredited)

Soundtrack
The music of the film was composed by Pannalal Ghosh with lyrics penned by P. L. Santoshi.

Box office

At the end of its threatical run, Basant did a gross collection of 80 lakhs, with a nett of 40 lakhs. It became the highest-grossing film of 1942, and also the highest-grossing film of all time. Basant's record was broken the next year by Kismet, which stars Ashok Kumar and Mumtaz Shanti in the lead roles.

Madhubala 
Madhubala, then Mumtaz, was spotted by Himanshu Rai when she was searching for work in film industry, along with her father Ataullah Khan. Rai soon cast her in Basant at a fee of 500 per month. Though she was uncredited in the film but Mumtaz became the financial backbone of her family after the film' release. She found work in other films as a child artist where she was credited as Baby Mumtaz. In 1947, five years after Rai's demise, his ex-wife and actress Devika Rani rechristened Mumtaz as Madhubala, literally meaning "honey belle", and also groomed her as a new leading lady.

References

External links

 
Songs

1942 films
1940s Hindi-language films
Indian black-and-white films
Films scored by Pannalal Ghosh
Films directed by Amiya Chakravarty
Indian musical drama films
1940s musical drama films
1942 drama films